Cyllecoris is a genus of true bugs belonging to the family Miridae. The species of this genus are found in Europe.

Species:
 Cyllecoris badius Liu & Zheng, 2000
 Cyllecoris djemagati V. Putshkov, 1970
 Cyllecoris equestris Stal, 1858

 Cyllecoris ernsti Matocq & Pluot-Sigwalt, 2006
 Cyllecoris histrionius  (Linnaeus, 1767) 
 Cyllecoris marginatus  (Fieber, 1870) 
 Cyllecoris merope Linnavuori, 1989
 Cyllecoris nakanishii Miyamoto, 1969
 Cyllecoris opacicollis Kerzhner, 1988
 Cyllecoris pericarti Magnien & Matocq, 2009
 Cyllecoris rectus Liu & Zheng, 2000
 Cyllecoris vicarius Kerzhner, 1988

References

Miridae